Most transportation historians date the history of Canada's railways as beginning on February 25, 1832, with the incorporation of British North America's first steam-powered railway, the Champlain and St. Lawrence Railroad. This line opened for traffic on July 21, 1836, although there are cases of animal-drawn mining tramways in Nova Scotia from the 18th century onward.

Thousands of railways followed the C&SL and were given a charter by the federal or provincial governments, although in most cases these charters never resulted in an actual line being constructed.  Many of these charters were so-called "paper railways" and were absorbed into other railways, that is they existed on paper with the actual trains bearing the name of another railway or system of railways.  For example, Canadian National Railways alone consisted of over some 400 railways (see Canadian National Railways-List of Companies).

The reason for these "paper" railways was the ease of getting a charter, this was often done by a major railway such as Canadian Pacific Railway or Grand Trunk Railway but, the true interests were kept hidden to keep attention away from the efforts of competing major railways to gain access to another's territory. In other instances local interests wanted a railway to connect their community with the main line of a major railway that did not enter their town, or to connect to another major railway for competitive reasons, to get lower freight rates, something that remains to this day. In many cases these local efforts were quickly taken over by a major railway to both expand its own network and to deny its competition access to traffic.

Streetcar and interurban railways were chartered provincially, in the case of Ontario under the Street Railway Act.

Non-common carrier railways did not require a charter under the Railway Act since they were used primarily for the owners own purposes, mainly logging and mining.

American railroads always operated in Canada under charters of subsidiary railways even though most had equipment lettered only for the parent company.  Most U.S. railroads also operated in Canada through subsidiary railways with one exception: Wabush Railway which had not a mile of track in Canada as it crossed southern Ontario using trackage rights granted by the Grand Trunk Railway of Canada.
These rights still exist with present-day Canadian National and Norfolk Southern, which runs into Windsor and Sarnia, Ontario. It formerly ran through Montreal, Quebec, but service was stopped due to such services causing traffic congestion.

This list of defunct railways includes only those railways that actually came into existence. Many were taken over by other railways or had a name change and thus continued to operate trains over the same tracks. A few ceased to exist because they went out of business and were abandoned and dismantled.

For simplicity on this list, Canadian National Railways (CNR) (pre-1960), Canadian National Railway (CN) (post-1960), Canadian Pacific Railway (CPR), Grand Trunk Railway (GTR), and Canadian Northern Railway (CNoR) will be abbreviated for notations.  Others will be abbreviated as required.

Also consult the list of active Canadian railways.

A

B

C

D

E

F

G

H

I

J

K

L

M

N

O

P

Q

R

S

T

V

W

Y

See also

 List of Canadian railways
 History of rail transport in Canada

References 

 Dorman, Robert: A Statutory History of the Steam and Electric Railways of Canada 1836-1937 Department of Transport, Canada
 Dorman, Robert: Appendix to above including addition of maps.
 Dorman, Robert; D.E.Stoltz: A Statutory History of Railways in Canada 1836-1986
 Churcher, Colin; Old Time Trains.  
 Smith, Ivan (1998), Significant Dates in Nova Scotia's Railway History (1850- 1899). Retrieved August 16, 2005.

Canada
Canada, defunct
Companies, Defunct
Railways, Defunct
Railways, Canada